

Placename
Hasselberg is a place name notably worn by:

 Hasselberg is a German municipality.

Family name
Hasselberg is a family name of Germanic origin, including:

 Heinz Hasselberg (1914–1989), a German cyclist.
 Per Hasselberg (1850-1894), is a Swedish sculptor.